Group D of the 2021 CONCACAF Gold Cup took place from 13 to 20 July 2021 in Houston's BBVA Stadium and Orlando's Exploria Stadium. The group consisted of Grenada, Honduras, Panama, and invitees Qatar.

Teams

Notes

Standings

In the quarter-finals:

The winners of Group D, Qatar, advanced to play the runners-up of Group A, El Salvador.
The runners-up of Group D, Honduras, advanced to play the winners of Group A, Mexico.

Matches

Qatar vs Panama

Honduras vs Grenada

Grenada vs Qatar

Panama vs Honduras

Honduras vs Qatar

Panama vs Grenada

Discipline
Fair play points would have been used as a tiebreaker if the overall and head-to-head records of teams were tied. These were calculated based on yellow and red cards received in all group matches as follows:
first yellow card: minus 1 point;
indirect red card (second yellow card): minus 3 points;
direct red card: minus 4 points;
yellow card and direct red card: minus 5 points;

Only one of the above deductions was applied to a player in a single match.

Notes

References

External links
 

Group D